Léonard Specht (born 16 April 1954) is a French former professional footballer who played as a defender. He was also chairman of RC Strasbourg in 2009.

References

External links
Profile
Profile

1954 births
Living people
Sportspeople from Bas-Rhin
French people of German descent
Association football defenders
French footballers
France international footballers
RC Strasbourg Alsace players
FC Girondins de Bordeaux players
Ligue 1 players
French football managers
RC Strasbourg Alsace managers
Footballers from Alsace